Following is a list of famous and notable Punjabi people, an ethnic group belonging to the Punjab region. It contains people mainly from what is today Punjab, Pakistan and Punjab, India, and people with Punjabi ancestry or people who speak Punjabi as their primary language.

Nobel laureates

Abdus Salam, Physics Nobel prize laureate
Har Gobind Khorana, Medicine Nobel prize laureate

Governors
Muslim
 Shahbaz Khan Kamboh, Governor of Bengal
 Wazir Khan, Governor of Ajmer
 Saadullah Khan, Grand Vizier of Mughal Empire
 Shaikh Gadai Kamboh, Sadr-i-sadur of Mughal Empire
 Hifzullah Khan, Governor of Sindh and Kashmir
 Muhammad Saleh Kamboh
 Shaikh Inayat Allah Kamboh
 Adina Beg Arain, Governor of Lahore and Multan
 Sayyid Abdullah Khan, Governor of Bijapur and Ajmer
 Sayyid Hassan Khan, Grand Vizier of Mughal Empire.
 Sayyid Hussain Khan, Mir Bakshi of Mughal Empire.

Hindu

 Raja Todar Mal, Finance minister of Mughal Empire

Rulers

Sikhs

 Maharaja Ranjit Singh was the founder of Sikh Empire
 Maharaja Kharak Singh 2nd ruler of the Sikh Empire
 Banda Singh Bahadur Commander-in-chief of Khalsa army
 Jassa Singh Ahluwalia founder of Ahluwalia Misl and leader of Dal Khalsa
 Nawab Kapur Singh Organizer of Sikh Confederacy
 Jassa Singh Ramgarhia founder of Ramgarhia Misl
 Jai Singh Kanhaiya one of the most powerful sikh rulers during Sikh Confederacies period founder of Kanhaiya Misl
 Charat Singh founder of Sukerchakia Misl father of Maha Singh and grandfather of Ranjit Singh
 Hari Singh Dhillon one of the most powerful and admired Sikh Worrier leaders of Bhangi Misl 
 Maha Singh son of Charat Singh and father of Ranjit Singh second chief of Sukerchakia Misl 
 Jhanda Singh Dhillon son of Hari Singh Dhillon under his leadership Bhangi Misl become the most powerful among all the Misls
 Baba Deep Singh founder of Shaheedan Misl
 Muslim 
Khizr Khan
Sultan Mubarak Shah
Sultan Muhammad Shah
 Shaikha Khokhar
 Jasrath Khokhar
 Sultan Zafar Khan
 Sultan Ahmed Shah
 Sultan Muizz-ud-din Muhammad Shah II
 Sultan Mahmud Shah I
 Sultan Shams-ud-din Muzaffar Shah II 
 Sultan Qutb-ud-din Bahadur Shah 
 Sultan Husseyn Langah I
 Sultan Sarang Khan

Generals

Sikh 
 Hari Singh Nalwa
 Chattar Singh Attariwalla
 Sham Singh Atariwala
 Jodh Singh Ramgarhia
 Akali Phula Singh
 Haqiqat Singh Kanhaiya
 Fateh Singh Ahluwalia
Jawahar Singh Aulakh
 Tej Singh
 Sher Singh Attariwalla
 Ranjodh Singh Majithia
 Mangal Singh Ramgarhia
 Akali Hanuman Singh

Hindu 
 Dewan Mokham Chand
 Misr Dewan Chand
 Mahan Singh Mirpuri Bali
Gulab Singh Dogra
Dhian Singh Dogra
Ranbir Singh
 Dewan Sawan Mal Chopra
 Raja Zorawar Singh Kahluria
 Dewan Mulraj Chopra

Muslim 
 Mian Ghaus Khan
 Sultan Mahmud Khan
 Ilahi Bakhsh
 Malik Fateh Khan Tiwana
 Fakir Azizuddin

Military

Pakistan Armed Forces

Air Force 
Air Chief Marshal Tanvir Mahmood Ahmed
 Air Chief Marshal Zafar Chaudhry
Air Chief Marshal Kaleem Saadat Rana
Air Chief Marshal Rao Qamar Suleman
Air Chief Marshal Zulfiqar Ali Khan
Air Marshal Abdul Rahim Khan
Air Marshal Nur Khan
Group Captain Cecil Chaudhry
 Pilot Officer Rashid Minhas, Nishan-e-Haider

Army 
 General (R) Raheel Sharif, former Chief of Army Staff of the Pakistan Army
General Qamar Javed Bajwa, current Chief of Army Staff of the Pakistan Army
 General Zia ul Haq, former Chief of Army Staff and President of Pakistan
General (R) Ashfaq Parvez Kayani, former Chief of Army Staff of the Pakistan army
General (R) Tikka Khan, former Chief of Army Staff of the Pakistan Army
General (R) Asif Nawaz Janjua, former Chief of Army Staff of the Pakistan Army
Lt Gen Asim Saleem Bajwa
Lt Gen (R) Abdul Ali Malik
Lt Gen (R) Nasser Khan Janjua
 Maj Gen (R) Rao Farman Ali
 Maj Gen (R) Muhammed Akbar Khan
Maj Gen Iftikhar Janjua, most senior Pakistani officer killed in battle during Indo-Pakistani War of 1971 while fighting with his troops on the front line
 Maj Gen (R) Iftikhar Khan, first local Commander in Chief of the Pakistan Army
 Maj Gen (R) Muhammad Yusaf Khan
 Maj Gen (R) Raja Sakhi Daler Khan
 Maj Gen (R) Akhtar Hussain Malik
 Maj Gen (R) Noel Israel Khokhar
Brig (R) Raja Habib ur Rahman Khan
Brig (R) Amir Gulistan Janjua
Major Tufail Muhammad, Nishan-e-Haider
Major Raja Aziz Bhatti, Nishan-e-Haider 
Major Muhammad Akram, Nishan-e-Haider
Major Shabbir Sharif, Nishan-e-Haider
Captain Muhammad Sarwar, Nishan-e-Haider 
Naik Saif Ali Janjua, Nishan-e-Haider
Lance Naik Muhammad Mahfuz, Nishan-e-Haider
Sowar Muhammad Hussain, Nishan-e-Haider

Navy
 Admiral (R) Muhammad Asif Sandila
 Admiral (R) Muhammad Afzal Tahir

Indian Armed Forces

Airforce
Air Chief Marshal Om Prakash Mehra, former Chief of Indian Air Force, Awarded highest military peace award.
Marshal Arjan Singh, former Chief of Indian Air Force; only marshal in the history of Indian Air Force
Air Chief Marshal Dilbagh Singh, former Chief of Indian Air Force
Air Chief Marshal Nirmal Chandra Suri, former Chief of Indian Air Force
Rakesh Sharma, Indian Air Force, first Indian in space

Army

General Deepak Kapoor, former Indian Army Chief
General Om Prakash Malhotra, former Indian Army Chief
Captain Saurabh Kalia, martyr of Kargil war
General Ved Prakash Malik, former Indian Army Chief
General Bikram Singh, former Indian Army Chief
Captain Arun Singh Jasrotia, 
General Pran Nath Thapar, former Indian Army Chief
General Nirmal Chander Vij, former Indian Army Chief
Lt General Jagjit Singh Aurora (1916–2005), General Officer Commanding-in-Chief (GOC-in-C) of the Eastern Command of the Indian Army during the Indo-Pakistani War of 1971; led the ground forces campaign in the eastern front of the war
Lt General Punita Arora, first woman in the Indian Armed Forces to reach the second highest rank of Lt General; first woman to become the Vice-Admiral of Indian Navy
 Major General Shabeg Singh
Brigadier Kuldip Singh Chandpuri (retired), awarded Maha Vir Chakra (MVC) by the Indian Army for his leadership in the Battle of Longewala
Captain Vikram Batra, former officer of Indian army, martyred in 1999 Kargil war and was awarded Param Vir Chakra posthumously

Navy
Admiral Robin K. Dhowan, former Chief of Indian Navy
Admiral S.M. Nanda, former Chief of Indian Navy

Other notables
Kiran Bedi, first woman IPS officer
 Uday Singh Taunque, awarded the Purple Heart and Bronze Star; first Indian to die in Iraq War as part of the US Army

Singapore Armed Forces

Army

 Colonel Gurcharan Singh Sekhon

Religious figures

Muslim Sufis and saints 

* Fariduddin Ganjshakar
 Rukn-e-Alam
 Shah Hussain 
 Sultan Bahu 
 Bulleh Shah
 Waris Shah 
 Khawaja Ghulam Farid
 Shah Inayat
 Mian Mir
 Shaikh Ahmad Sirhindi
 Mian Muhammad Baksh
 Meher Ali Shah

Hindu Gurus and saints
 Baba Shri Chandra Ji Maharaj
 Baba Ram Thaman
 Rama Tirtha
 Virajanand Dandeesha
 Ramdev
 Swami Shraddhanand
 Chauranginatha
 Mastana Balochistani
 Shah Satnam Singh
 Kanwar Saheb

Buddhist figures 

 Khema
 Bhadda Kapilani, 
 Anoja 
 Kumaralata.

Radha Soami Satsang Beas
 Baba Jaimal Singh
 Baba Sawan Singh
 Sardar Bahadur Maharaj Jagat Singh
 Maharaj Charan Singh
 Baba Gurinder Singh

Ahmadiyya community

 Mirza Ghulam Ahmad (1889–1908)
 Malauna Hakeem Noor-ud-Din (1908–1914)
 Mirza Basheer-ud-Din Mahmood Ahmad (1914–1965)
 Mirza Tahir Ahmad (1982–2003)
 Mirza Masroor Ahmad (2003–present)

Business

India

Pakistan 

 Anwar Pervez, founder of Bestway
 Ashar Aziz, founder of FireEye in Silicon Valley
 Bashir Tahir, former CEO of Dhabi Group
 Fred Hassan, director at Warburg Pincus
 James Caan, founder of Hamilton Bradshaw
 Malik Riaz, founder of Bahria Town,
 Mansoor Ijaz, founder of Crescent Investment Management Ltd
 Mian Muhammad Latif, founder of Chenab Group
 Mian Muhammad Mansha, founder of Nishat Group
 Michael Chowdrey, founder of Atlas Air
 Muhammad Zahoor, owner of ISTIL Group
 Shahid Khan, owner of Flex-N-Gate, Jacksonville Jaguars and Fulham F.C
 Sohaib Abbasi, former CEO of Informatica
 Zameer Choudrey, CEO of Bestway

Music

Pakistan

Punjabi Folk 

 Alam Lohar
 Arif Lohar
 Inayat Hussain Bhatti
 Iqbal Bahu
 Khawaja Pervez
 Musarrat Nazir
 Pathanay Khan
 Saieen Zahoor
 Samina Syed
 Shaukat Ali
 Shazia Manzoor
 Tahira Syed

Sufi Qawwali 

 Fateh Ali Khan
 Nusrat Fateh Ali Khan
 Farrukh Fateh Ali Khan
 Rahat Fateh Ali Khan
 Badar Miandad
 Ghulam Farid Sabri
 Maqbool Ahmad Sabri
 Amjad Sabri

Classical Hindustani Gharanas

Panjabi Gharana 
 Shaukat Hussain
 Ustad Tafu Khan
 Tari Khan

Patiala Gharana 
 Barkat Ali Khan
 Amanat Ali Khan
 Bade Fateh Ali Khan
 Ghulam Ali
 Hamid Ali Khan
 Asad Amanat Ali Khan
 Farida Khanum

Sham Chaurasia Gharana 

 Salamat Ali Khan
 Sharafat Ali Khan
 Shafqat Ali Khan

Modern Playback 

Abdullah Qureshi 
Abrar-ul-Haq
Aima Baig 
Ali Aftab Saeed 
Ali Azmat
Ali Sethi
Ali Zafar
Annie Khalid 
Asrar Shah 
Atif Aslam
Bilal Saeed
Bohemia
Faakhir Mehmood
Fakhar-e-Alam
Farhad Humayun 
Farhan Saeed
Goher Mumtaz 
Hadiqa Kiani
Haroon
Humaira Arshad 
Humaira Channa
Imran Khan
Javed Bashir 
Jawad Ahmad
Khursheed Bano
Mahvash Waqar
Masood Rana 
Meesha Shafi
Mustafa Zahid
Nabeel Shaukat Ali 
Naheed Akhtar
Naseebo Lal
Naseem Begum
Noor Jehan
Nouman Javaid
Sahir Ali Bagga
Salman Ahmad  
Sanam Saeed
Sara Raza Khan
Shamoon Ismail
Shiraz Uppal
Shuja Haider
Tassawar Khanum
Umair Jaswal
Uzair Jaswal
Waris Baig
Zil-e-Huma
Zubaida Khanum
Zulfiqar Jabbar Khan

India

Punjabi folk

 Asa Singh Mastana
 Amar Singh Chamkila
 Didar Sandhu
 Dolly Guleria
 Gurdas Maan
 Hans Raj Hans
 Harbhajan Mann
 Harshdeep Kaur
 Jagmohan Kaur
 Jaswinder Brar
 Kuldeep Manak
 Mohammad Sadiq
 Pammi Bai
 Parkash Kaur
 Ranjit Kaur
 Sardool Sikander
 Satwinder Bitti
 Surinder Kaur

Sufi Qawwali

 Rabbi Shergill
 Master Saleem
 Puranchand Wadali
 Pyarelal Wadali

Classical Hindustani Music

 Jagjit Singh

Patiala Gharana

 Sardool Sikander
 Barkat Sidhu
 Som Dutt Battu
 Shiv Dayal Batish

Sham Chaurasia Gharana

 Jyoti Nooran
 Sultana Nooran

Modern playback

 AP Dhillon
 Afsana Khan
 Alla Rakha
 Amrinder Gill
 Anushka Manchanda
 Akhil Sachdeva
 Arijit Singh
 Armaan Malik
 Asees Kaur
 Babbu Mann
 Bhupinder Singh
 Roshan Prince
 Daler Mehndi
 Diljit Dosanjh
 Garry Sandhu
 Gippy Grewal
 Gurinder Gill
 Gurnam Bhullar
 Guru Randhawa
 Hard Kaur
 Hardy Sandhu
 Himani Kapoor
 Honey Singh
 Jass Manak
 Jassi Gill
 Jasmine Sandlas
 Jaspinder Narula
 Jazzy B
 Karan Aujla
 Kanika Kapoor
 Kanth Kaler
 Kavita Seth
 Kundan Lal Saigal
 Labh Janjua
 Mahendra Kapoor
 Meena Kapoor
 Mika Singh
 Mohammed Rafi
 Mohit Chauhan
 Narinder Biba
 Narendra Chanchal
 Neeraj Shridhar
 Neha Bhasin
 Neha Kakkar
 Nimrat Khaira
 Ninja
 Nitin Mukesh
 Miss Pooja
 Rekha Bhardwaj
 Richa Sharma
 Satinder Sartaaj
 Shailendra Singh
 Shibani Kashyap
 Shehnaz Gill
 Sidhu Moose Wala
 Sonu Nigam
 Sukhwinder Singh
 Suraiyya
 Taz
 Tony Kakkar
 Tulsi Kumar
 Zakir Hussain

Cartoonists
Shekhar Gurera, editorial cartoonist
Pran Kumar Sharma, cartoonist of Chacha Chaudhary fame
Farooq Qaiser

Doctors

India 

 Satya Paul Agarwal
 M. M. S. Ahuja
 Jasbir Singh Bajaj
 Dr Mukesh Batra
 Harpinder Singh Chawla
 Ram Nath Chopra
 Kirpal Singh Chugh
 Harbans Lall Gulati
 Gagandeep Kang
 Kapil Sharma
 Sunil Grover
 Ved Prakash Kamboj
 Tarlochan Singh Kler
 Purshotam Lal
 Prithipal Singh Maini
 Ravinder N. Maini
 Jaswant Singh Neki
 Harvinder Sahota
 Baldev Singh
 Daljit Singh
 Khushdeva Singh
 Sahib Singh Sokhey
 Janak Raj Talwar
 K. K. Talwar
 Purshottam Lal Wahi
 Mahinder Watsa
 Khushwant Lal Wig

Educators and scientists

Pakistan 

 Asad Abidi, professor of electrical engineering at the University of California, Los Angeles (UCLA)
 Masud Ahmed, theoretical physicist and one of the leading figures of the Theoretical Physics Group - the group that developed the theoretical designs of Pakistan's nuclear weapons
 Ishtiaq Ahmed, professor of political science at the University of Stockholm
 Nazir Ahmed, experimental physicist and first chairman of the Pakistan Atomic Energy Commission (PAEC)
 Farooq Azam, professor of oceanography at the University of California, San Diego
 Tariq Ali, political activist, historian, writer, journalist and public intellectual
Rafi Muhammad Chaudhry, nuclear physicist and pioneer of Pakistan's nuclear weapons research program
Nayyar Ali Dada, architect in modernist architecture
 Fayyazuddin, theoretical physicist
 Mahbub ul Haq, economist and inventor of the Human Development Index (HDI)
 Tasawar Hayat, mathematician
 Shahbaz Khan, hydrologist and director of the UNESCO cluster office in Jakarta
 Sultan Bashiruddin Mahmood, nuclear engineer
 Salim Mehmud, rocket scientist
 Atif Mian, professor of economics, public policy and finance at Princeton University
 Zia Mian, physicist and co-director of the program on science and global security at Princeton University
 Ghulam Murtaza, theoretical physicist
 Qaiser Mushtaq, mathematician
 Adil Najam, dean of global studies at Boston University
 Ayyub Ommaya, neurosurgeon and inventor of the Ommaya reservoir
 Khalil Qureshi, physical chemist
 Muneer Ahmad Rashid, mathematical physicist
Abdus Salam, theoretical physicist who won the Nobel Prize in Physics for his contributions to the electroweak unification theory
 Riazuddin, theoretical physicist and one of the leading figures of the Theoretical Physics Group - the group that developed the theoretical designs of Pakistan's nuclear weapons

India 

M. M. S. Ahuja, Indian physician and endocrinologist
Om P. Bahl, Indian molecular biologist
Jasbir Singh Bajaj, Indian physician and diabetologist; conferred with the Padma Vibhushan award
Hoon Balakram, Indian mathematician
Indu Banga, historian at Punjab University, Chandigarh
Lekh Raj Batra, distinguished mycologist and linguist
Sabeer Bhatia, founder of the Hotmail email service and Jaxtr
Shanti Swaroop Bhatnagar, first director-general of the Council of Scientific and Industrial Research (CSIR)
Praveen Chaudhari, Indian American physicist
Kasturi Lal Chopra, Indian material physicist
Ram Nath Chopra, Indian medical officer; widely considered the "father of Indian pharmacology"
Virender Lal Chopra, Indian biotechnologist, geneticist, agriculturalist, former director-general of the Indian Council of Agricultural Research (ICAR)
Kirpal Singh Chugh, Indian nephrologist
Manoj Datta, Indian engineer
Sukh Dev, Indian organic chemist
Vinod Dham, engineer, entrepreneur and venture capitalist; popularly known as "Pentium Engineer"
Meena Dhanda, philosopher and academic at University of Wolverhampton
Satish Dhawan
Baldev Singh Dhillon
Vijay K. Dhir, Indo-American scientist
Guru Prakash Dutta, Indian cell biologist and immunologist
Khem Singh Gill, Indian academic, geneticist
Piara Singh Gill, Indian nuclear physicist
 Sucha Singh Gill, Indian academic, economist
Khem Singh Grewal, Indian pharmacologist
Ravi Grover, Indian nuclear scientist
Hansraj Gupta, Indian mathematician 
Sardul Singh Guraya, Indian biologist
Ranjit Lal Jetley, soldier and scientist
Gurcharan Singh Kalkat, Indian agricultural scientist 
Ved Prakash Kamboj
Vijay Kumar Kapahi, Indian astrophysicist
Narinder Singh Kapany, Indian-born American Sikh physicist 
Satinder Vir Kessar, Indian synthetic organic chemist
Har Gobind Khorana, Nobel Prize winner 
Pradeep Khosla, academic computer scientist
Vinod Khosla Indian American engineer and businessman
Rakesh Khurana, Indian-American educator
Neelam Kler, Indian neonatologist
Nayanjot Lahiri, Indian historian and archaeologist at Ashoka University 
Purshotam Lal, Indian cardiologist
Narinder Kumar Mehra, Indian immunologist
Mridula Mukherjee, Indian historian specialized in modern India Jawaharlal Nehru University
Manohar Lal Munjal, Indian acoustical engineer
Yash Pal, Indian scientist, educator and educationist
Mohinder Singh Randhawa, Punjabi civil servant, botanist, historian, art and culture promoter, prominent writer
Narinder Singh Randhawa, Indian agricultural scientist
Suresh Rattan
Birbal Sahni, Indian paleobotanist who studied the fossils of the Indian subcontinent
Daya Ram Sahni, Indian archaeologist
Harvinder Sahota, Indian American cardiologist
Hargurdeep (Deep) Saini, Vice President and Principal of the University of Toronto at Mississauga, Ontario, Canada
Sartaj Sahni, American-Indian computer scientist
Harvinder Sahota, Indian American cardiologist
Pritam Saini, English, Punjabi, Hindi and Urdu writer; historian; literary critic
Sanjay Saini, professor of radiology, Harvard Medical School
Subhash Saini, senior computer scientist, NASA Ames Research Center, USA
P. K. Sethi
Dheeraj Sharma, professor at IIM-Ahmedabad; writer
Khushdeva Singh, Indian physician and social worker
Manjit Singh, armament scientist
Upinder Singh, Indian historian specialized in ancient India at University of Delhi
Sahib Singh Sokhey, Indian biochemist
Janak Raj Talwar, Indian cardiothoracic scientist
B. K. Thapar, Indian archaeologist; Director-general of the Archaeological Survey of India, 1978–1981
Kartar Singh Thind
Surinder Vasal, Indian geneticist scientist
Purshottam Lal Wahi
Khushwant Lal Wig, Indian physician
Bagicha Singh Minhas, Indian economist

Astronauts

India 
Kalpana Chawla
Air Commodore Ravish Malhotra
Rakesh Sharma, first Indian in space

Film & TV

Bollywood (India)
The following is a list of famous Punjabi families and individual artistes who have worked in Bollywood:

Individual Actors

 Achala Sachdev
 Aditya Roy Kapur
 Akshay Kumar
 Akshay Dogra
 Akanksha Juneja
 Annu Kapoor
 Amrinder Gill
 Ammy Virk
 Arjan Bajwa
 Arjun Rampal
 Armaan Kohli
 Avtar Gill
 Aryan Vaid
 Ayushman Khurana
 Babbal Rai
 Bhumika Chawla
 Bina Rai
 Binnu Dhillon
 Celina Jaitley
 Diljit Dosanjh
 Dilip Kumar
 Deepak Parashar
 Geeta Bali
 Geeta Basra
 Gippy Grewal
 Gracy Singh
 Gul Panag
 Gulshan Grover
 Gurdas Maan
 Gurpreet Ghuggi
 Gurshabad Singh
 Harman Baweja
 Harry Ahluwalia
 Jassi Gill
 Jaspal Bhatti
 Jimmy Shergill
 Juhi Chawla
 Jyothika
 Kajal Aggarwal
 Kanwaljit Singh
 Kapil Sharma
 Karan Johar
 Karan Singh Grover
 Kidar Nath Sharma
 Kiran Juneja
 Kirron Kher
 Kriti Sanon
 Kulraj Randhawa
 Kulbhushan Kharbanda
 Kunal Kapoor
 Lakha Lakhwinder Singh
 Mahek Chahal
 Mahie Gill
 Mandira Bedi
 Mangal Dhillon
 Manjot Singh
 Manoj Pahwa
 Mehar Mittal
 Minissha Lamba
 Mink Brar
 Mona Singh
 Monica Bedi
 Mukesh Khanna
 Mukesh Rishi
 Mukesh Tiwari
 Navin Nischol
 Neeru Bajwa
 Neetu Singh
 Neha Dhupia
 Om Prakash
 Om Puri
 Parmeet Sethi
 Pavan Malhotra
 Pooja Batra
 Poonam Dhillon
 Pran
 Praveen Kumar
 Prem Chopra
 Priya Gill
 Preity Zinta
 Pulkit Samrat
 Puneet Issar
 Raj Babbar
 Rajat Kapoor
 Rajit Kapur
 Rakesh Bedi
 Rahul Dev
 Rakul Preet Singh
 Ranjeet
 Ranvir Shorey
 Rana Ranbir
 Ram Kapoor
 Raveena Tandon
 Rati Agnihotri
Ridhi Dogra
 Ruby Bhatia
 Sahil Anand
 Samir Soni
 Sargun Mehta
 Saumya Tandon
 Sudesh Berry
 Shakti Kapoor
 Sheeba Chaddha
 Shiny Ahuja
 Shoma Anand
 Sidharth Malhotra
 Simi Garewal
 Simone Singh
 Simran Bagga
 Smriti Irani
 Sonu Sood
 Sunny Leone
 Suraiya
 Surbhi Jyoti
 Taapsee Pannu
 Tinnu Anand
 Urvashi Sharma
 Vaani Kapoor
 Varun Sharma
 Vicky Kaushal
Vidyut Jamwal
 Vikas Bhalla
 Vijay Arora
 Vinod Mehra
 Vivek Shauq
 Yami Gautam
 Yash Johar

Directors

 Abdur Rashid Kardar
 Abhishek Kapoor
 Aditya Chopra
 Anil Sharma.                             
 Anurag Singh
 B. R. Chopra
 Brij Sadanah
 Chetan Anand
 David Dhawan
 Deepa Mehta
 Deepak Balraj Vij
 Deepak Sareen
 Dharmesh Darshan
 Goldie Behl
 Guddu Dhanoa 
 Gulzar                                                                                                 
 Harry Baweja
 Inder Raj Anand
 J.P.Dutta
 Kamal Sadanah  
 Karan Johar
 Karan Malhotra
 Kunal Kohli
 Lekh Tandon
 Loveleen Tandan
 Mira Nair
 Mohan Kumar
 Mukul Anand
 Pankaj Parashar
 Prakash Mehra
 Punit Malhotra
 Raj Kanwar
 Raj Khosla
 Rajiv Rai
 Rajkumar Kohli
 Rakeysh Omprakash Mehra
 Ramanand Sagar
 Ravi Chopra
 Ravi Tandon
 Shekhar Kapoor
 Siddharth Anand
 Subhash Ghai
 Suneel Darshan
 Tinnu Anand
 Umesh Mehra
 Vidhu Vinod Chopra
 Vijay Anand
 Vipin Handa
 Yash Chopra

Documentary filmmakers
 Mukesh Gautam

Lollywood (Pakistan)

 Aamina Sheikh
 Aasia Begum
 Adeel Chaudhry
 Adnan Shah
 Ahmed Ali Akbar
 Ahsan Khan
 Akmal
 Albela
 Ali Ejaz
 Ali Kazmi
 Ali Zafar
 Armeena Khan
 Asad Malik
 Aslam Pervaiz
 Babar Ali
 Babra Sharif
 Bahar Begum
 Bilal Ashraf
 Bushra Ansari
 Firdous Begum
 Ghulam Mohiuddin
 Gohar Rasheed
 Habib-ur-Rehman
 Hamid Rana
 Hamza Ali Abbasi
 Humayun Saeed
 Iftikhar Thakur
 Inayat Hussain Bhatti
 Irfan Khoosat
 Javed Sheikh
 Jia Ali
 Kifayat Hussain Bhatti
 Masood Akhtar
 Meera
 Mikaal Zulfiqar
 Moammar Rana
 Mohsin Abbas Haider
 Munawar Zarif
 Naghma
 Najma Mehboob
 Nargis
 Nayyar Ejaz
 Neelo
 Nirma
 Rafi Khawar
 Rani
 Resham
 Sabiha Khanum
 Sahiba Afzal
 Sajjad Kishwar
 Saleem Sheikh
 Salma Mumtaz
 Salman Shahid
 Shaan Shahid
 Shafqat Cheema
 Shahid Hameed
 Shahida Mini
 Sultan Rahi
 Swaran Lata
 Tariq Aziz
 Usman Peerzada
 Waheed Murad
 Yasir Hussain
 Yousuf Khan
 Zara Sheikh
 Zeba

Directors

 Anwar Kamal Pasha 
 Hassan Tariq
 Iqbal Kashmiri
 Javed Raza
 M. Akram
 Masood Parvez
 Pervaiz Kaleem
 Riaz Shahid
 Sarmad Khoosat
 Syed Noor

Punjabi cinema (India)

Directors

 Amberdeep Singh
 Amitoj Maan
 Anurag Singh
 Baljit Singh Deo
 Gippy Grewal
 Harry Baweja
 Jagdeep Sidhu
 Manmord Sidhu
 Pankaj Batra
 Rohit Jugraj Chauhan
 Simerjit Singh
 Smeep Kang

Actors

The Punjabi film industry has produced a number of successful actors, actresses, writers, directors and filmmakers, many of whom have been known internationally.

Actors

Actresses

Tamil cinema (India)

 Simran Bagga, Punjabi Hindu
 Jyothika, Punjabi Hindu
 Kajal Agarwal, Punjabi Hindu
 Sonia Aggarwal, Punjabi Hindu

International Film and TV personalities

 Lilly Singh
 Purva Bedi
 Waris Ahluwalia
 Tarsem Singh
 Monica Dogra
 Param Gill
 Kunal Nayyar

Ancient figures

 Porus
 Taxiles
 Chanakya
 Kumāralāta

Folklore

 Heer Ranjha
 Mirza Sahiba
 Puran Bhagat
 Sayful Muluk
 Sohni Mahiwal

Sikh Gurus

 Guru Nanak Dev, founder of Sikhism
 Guru Angad
 Guru Amar Das 
 Guru Ram Das
 Guru Arjan Dev, was the first two Gurus Martyred Sikh faith
 Guru Hargobind 
 Guru Har Rai  
 Guru Har Krishan 
 Guru Tegh Bahadur 
 Guru Gobind Singh, Last Sikh Guru in human form founder of Khalsa panth

Other Religious Sikhs figure
 Bhai Kanhaiya, he was known for pouring water for all the wounded members of the battlefield no matter whether they were Sikhs or enemies
 Baba Buddha, one of earliest Sikh figures
 Bhai Mardana, was the first Sikh

Panj Pyare or five beloved
 Bhai Daya Singh, first in Panj Pyare
 Bhai Sahib Singh
 Bhai Himmat Singh
 Bhai Mohkam Singh
 Bhai Dharam Singh

Literature

Punjabi, Hindi and Urdu

India 

 Bhai Gurdas
 Amrita Pritam
 Bhai Kahn Singh Nabha
 Bhai Vir Singh
 Damodar Das Arora
 Dhani Ram Chatrik
 Giani Gurdit Singh
 Gulzar (Sampooran Singh Gulzar), Oscar winner for the film Slumdog Millionaire
 Harbhajan Singh
 Inderjit Hasanpuri
 Jaswant Neki
 Jaswant Singh Kanwal
 Jaswant Singh Rahi
 Kulwant Singh Virk
 Mehr Lal Soni Zia Fatehabadi
 Nanak Singh
 Navtej Bharati
 Pandit Lekh Ram
 Pash
 Rajinder Singh Bedi
 Rupinderpal Singh Dhillon
 Sahir Ludhianvi
 Shardha Ram Phillauri
 Shiv Kumar Batalvi
 Surjit Hans

Pakistan 

 Baba Farid
 Shah Hussain
 Sultan Bahu
 Bulleh Shah
 Ali Haider Multani
 Lutf Ali
 Waris Shah
 Hashim
 Qadir Yar
 Mian Muhammad Baksh
 Khawaja Ghulam Fareed
 Ghulam Rasool Alampuri
 Zafar Ali Khan
 Muhammad Iqbal
 Hakim Ahmad Shuja
 Hafeez Jalandhari
 Faiz Ahmad Faiz
 Ustad Daman
 Saadat Hasan Manto
 Shareef Kunjahi
 Ahmad Rahi
 Habib Jalib
 Anwar Masood
 Aizaz Ahmad Azar
 Mazhar Tirmazi
 Ali Arshad Mir
 Mir Tanha Yousafi

English

 Alamgir Hashmi
 Ahmed Rashid
 Amrita Pritam
 Chetan Bhagat
 Deepak Chopra
 Jaspreet Singh
 Kartar Singh Duggal
 Khushwant Singh
 Manil Suri
 Mohammed Hanif
 Mulk Raj Anand
 Nadeem Aslam
 Neville Tuli
 Partap Sharma
 Romila Thapar
 Susham Bedi
 Tariq Ali
 Ved Mehta
 Vikram Seth
 Yuyutsu Sharma
 Zulfikar Ghose

Journalists

Print

India

 Ajit Saini
 Angela Saini
 Aroon Purie
 Barjinder Singh Hamdard
 Barkha Dutt
 Karan Thapar
 Kuldip Nayar
 Pritam Saini
 Sadhu Singh Hamdard
 Swati Mia Saini
 Tarun Tejpal
 Tavleen Singh
 Vikram Chandra
 Vinod Mehta
 Yuyutsu Sharma

England
Simon Singh
Riz Khan

Pakistan

 Agha Shorish Kashmiri
 Ayaz Amir
 Hameed Nizami
 Janbaz Mirza
 Najam Sethi
 Mazhar Ali Khan
 Mubashir Lucman

Electronic/broadcast

India

 Amrita Cheema
 Aniruddha Bahal
 Barkha Dutt
 Daljit Dhaliwal
 Karan Thapar
 Monita Rajpal
 Satinder Bindra
 Tavleen Singh

Pakistan
 Yawar Hayat Khan
 Mishal Husain
 Hassan Nisar
 Suhail Warraich

Models

 Amarjot Kaur
 Harnaaz Kaur Sandhu, Punjabi beauty pageant titleholder and model who was crowned Miss Universe 2021
 Hasleen Kaur
 Jesse Randhawa, Bollywood model
 Kuljeet Randhawa
 Mahek Chahal
 Mandira Bedi
 Navneet Kaur Dhillon
 Neha Kapur
 Neelam Gill, Burberry 
 Gurleen Chopra, model
 Simran Kaur Mundi
 Sonampreet Bajwa

Revolutionaries

 Rai Ahmad Khan Kharal
 Bhagat Singh
 Bhai Mati Das
 Bhai Parmanand
 Choudhry Rahmat Ali
 Ganda Singh Phangureh
 Harnam Singh
 Jahanara Shahnawaz
 Kartar Singh Sarabha
 Lala Lajpat Rai
 Madan Lal Dhingra
 Muhammad Arif Khan Rajbana Sial
 Muhammad Iqbal
 Raja Ghazanfar Ali Khan
 Sardul Singh Caveeshar
 Sukhdev
 Udham Singh

Politicians

India

 Amarinder Singh
 Arun Jaitley, former Finance Minister of India
 Ashwani Kumar
 Bhagwant Mann, Chief Minister of Punjab (India)
 Baldev Singh
 Bibi Jagir Kaur
 Buta Singh
 Charanjit Singh Channi, former Chief Minister of Punjab (India)
 Darbara Singh
 Giani Zail Singh, former President of India
 Girdhari Lal Dogra
 Gulzari Lal Nanda
 Gurdial Singh Dhillon
 Harkishan Singh Surjeet
 Inder Kumar Gujral, former Prime Minister of India
 Jagjit Singh Taunque
 Krishan Kant
 Kanshi Ram
 Madanlal Khurana
 Sir Sikandar Hayat Khan 
 Malik Umar Hayat Khan
 Manmohan Singh, former Prime Minister of India
 Manohar Lal Khattar, Chief Minister of Haryana
 Master Tara Singh
 Navjot Singh Sidhu
 Parkash Singh Badal
 Pratap Singh Kairon
 Priya Dutt
 Rai Bahadur Chaudhari Dewan Chand Saini
 Rajinder Kaur Bhattal
 Raghav Chadha
 Sant Fateh Singh
 Sardul Singh Caveeshar
 Sheila Dikshit
 Simranjit Singh Mann
 Surjit Singh Barnala
 Sushma Swaraj 
 Swaran Singh
 Laxmi Kanta Chawla
 Sukhdev Singh Dhindsa
 Parminder Singh Dhindsa
 Sarup Chand Singla

Pakistan

 Allama Muhammad Iqbal
 Chaudhry Afzal Haq
 Chaudhry Amir Hussain
 Chaudhry Muhammad Ali
 Chaudhry Muhammad Sarwar Khan
 Chaudhry Pervaiz Elahi
 Chaudhry Shujaat Hussain
 Choudhary Rahmat Ali
 Fazal Ilahi Chaudhry
 Feroz Khan Noon
 Ghulam Bibi
 Hamza Shahbaz
 Hanif Ramay
 Liaqat Abbas Bhatti
 Liaqat Ali Khan
 Malik Amjad Ali Noon
 Malik Anwer Ali Noon
 Ghulam Muhammad
 Malik Meraj Khalid
 Master Taj-uj-Din Ansari
 Mazhar Ali Azhar
 Mian Iftikharuddin
 Mian Muhammad Shahbaz Sharif
 Mian Umar Hayat
 Muhammad Rafiq Tarar
 Muhammad Zia-ul-Haq
 Mushahid Hussain Syed
 Nawabzada Nasrullah Khan
 Nawaz Sharif
 Nisar Ali Khan
 Omer Sarfraz Cheema
 Rana Sanaullah Khan
 Rana Mashood Ahmad Khan
 Rana Muhammad Iqbal Khan
 Saqlain Anwar Sipra
 Sardar Ayaz Sadiq
 Shahbaz Sharif
 Shahid Hussain Bhatti
 Sheikh Hissam-ud-Din
 Sheikh Waqas Akram
 Syed Ata Ullah Shah Bukhari
 Syeda Sughra Imam
 Wasim Sajjad

United States
 Preet Bharara, former member of the U.S. Attorney for the Southern District of New York
 Nikki Haley, Governor of South Carolina, former member of the United States House of Representatives
 Piyush "Bobby" Jindal, Governor of Louisiana, former member of the United States House of Representatives
 Jenifer Rajkumar, Member of New York State Assembly from Queens
 Ro Khanna, Member of United States House of Representatives from California's 17th congressional district

United Kingdom 
Rishi Sunak, Prime Minister of the United Kingdom
Sajid Javid
Sajjad Karim

Canada
Harjit Sajjan
Jagmeet Singh
Raj Saini
Sonia Sidhu
Navdeep Bains
Gurratan Singh
Gagan Sikand
Tim Uppal

Sportspersons

Baseball

 Jasvir Rakkar

Chess
 Tania Sachdev

Table Tennis
 Manika Batra

Tennis

 Shikha Uberoi
 Yuki Bhambri

Cricket

India

 Aashish Kapoor
 Ajay Ratra
 Akash Chopra
 Amarjit Kaypee
 Ashok Malhotra
 Atul Wassan
 Balwinder Sandhu
 Barinder Sran
 Bhupinder Singh snr
 Bishan Singh Bedi
 Chetan Sharma
 Gautam Gambhir
 Gourav Dhiman
 Gurkeerat Singh
 Gursharan Singh
 Harbhajan Singh
 Harvinder Singh
 Jahangir Khan
 Kapil Dev
 Lala Amarnath
 Madan Lal
 Maninder Singh
 Manoj Prabhakar
 Mohinder Amarnath
 Navjot Singh Sidhu
 Nikhil Chopra
 Paras Dogra
 Piyush Chawla
 Rajinder Ghai
 Reetinder Sodhi
 Sarandeep Singh
 Shikhar Dhawan
 Sunny Sohal
 Surinder Amarnath
 Surinder Khanna
 V. R. V. Singh
 Vijay Mehra
 Vikram Rathour
 Virat Kohli
 Yuvraj Singh
 Yograj Singh
 Yadavendra Singh

Pakistan

 Aamer Malik
 Aamer Sohail
 Aaqib Javed
 Abdul Hafeez Kardar
 Abdul Qadir
 Abdul Razzaq
 Aizaz Cheema
 Asif Masood
 Ata-ur-Rehman
 Azeem Hafeez
 Azhar Mahmood
 Fazal Mahmood
 Ijaz Ahmed
 Imran Khan
 Imran Farhat
 Imran Nazir
 Imtiaz Ahmed
 Intikhab Alam
 Inzamam-ul-Haq
 Kamran Akmal
 Khan Mohammad
 Mahmood Hussain
 Majid Khan
 Maqsood Ahmed
 Mohammad Hafeez
 Mohammad Ilyas
 Mohammad Nazir
 Mohammad Wasim
 Mohammad Yousuf
 Mohammed Asif
 Moin Khan
 Mudassar Nazar
 Mushtaq Ahmed
 Pervez Sajjad
 Rameez Raja
 Rocky Khan
 Saeed Ahmed
 Saleem Altaf
 Saleem Elahi
 Saleem Malik
 Salman Butt
 Saqlain Mushtaq
 Sarfraz Nawaz
 Shabbir Ahmed
 Shoaib Akhtar
 Shoaib Malik
 Shujauddin
 Sohail Tanvir
 Tahir Naqqash
 Talat Ali
 Taufeeq Umar
 Waqar Hasan
 Waqar Younis
 Wasim Akram
 Wasim Raja
 Zaheer Abbas

England

 Ajaz Akhtar
 Ajmal Shahzad
 Monty Panesar
 Ravi Bopara

Canada

 Ashish Bagai
 Harvir Baidwan
 Haninder Dhillon
 Ishwar Maraj
 Jimmy Hansra
 Harjit Singh Sajjan

New Zealand

 Ish Sodhi

Basketball
 Sim Bhullar
 Satnam Singh Bhamara
 Amjyot Singh

Hockey

Field hockey

 Abdul Rashid
 Ajitpal Singh
 Asif Bajwa
 Balbir Singh Sr.
 Baljeet Singh Saini
 Baljit Singh Dhillon
 Balwant (Bal) Singh Saini
 Gagan Ajit Singh
 Hanif Khan
 Hasan Sardar
 Inder Singh
 Kalimullah
 Kamran Ashraf
 Kulbir Bhaura
 Manzoor Hussain
 Muhammad Shahbaz
 Prabhjot Singh
 Prithipal Singh
 Ramandeep Singh
 Ravi Kahlon
 Saini Sisters
 Shahbaz Ahmed
 Shahnaz Sheikh
 Sardara Singh
 Sohail Abbas
 Wasim Feroz

Ice hockey

 Jujhar Khaira
 Manny Malhotra

Athletics

 Neeraj Chopra, first Indian athlete to win a gold medal
 Arshad Nadeem
 Milkha Singh
 Kamaljeet Sandhu
 Makhan Singh
 Ajmer Singh

Golf

 Ashbeer Saini
 Jeev Milkha Singh
 Jyoti Randhawa
 Arjun Atwal
 P. G. Sethi
 Gaurav Ghei
 Shiv Kapur
 Gaganjeet Bhullar

Wrestling

 Ghulam Muhammad (The Great Gama), remained undefeated
 The Great Khali, World Heavyweight Champion
 Dara Singh
 Bholu Pahalwan 
 Premchand Dogra
 Aslam Pehlwan Rustam-e-Punjab
 Tiger Jeet Singh
 The Singh Brothers, WWE wrestlers
 Younus Khan (former Rustam-e-Pakistan), Sitara-e-Imtiaz
 Jinder Mahal (real name Yuvraj Singh Dhesi), WWE Champion

Shooting

 Abhinav Bindra, first individual Olympic gold medalist
 Gagan Narang, the only Indian to win two medals at a World championship
 Avneet Sidhu, Commonwealth Games medalist, Arjun Awardee

Cycling
 Alexi Grewal, American-Sikh, won gold medal in Olympics

Soccer

 Michael Chopra, English footballer
 Harpal Singh
 Harmeet Singh
 Gurpreet Singh Sandhu, second Indian goalkeeper and first to professionally play as GK for 1st division European club
 Sandesh Jhingan, India u-23 and national team player, was adjudged the best footballer of the inaugural ISL
 Jarnail Singh
 Sarpreet Singh

Boxing

 Amir Iqbal Khan

Volleyball
 Nirmal Saini

Weightlifting 

 Nooh Dastgir Butt

Freestyle Wrestling 

 Muhammad Inam Butt
 Muhammad Bashir
 Amar Dhesi
 Zaman Anwar
 Mandhir Kooner
 Nishan Randhawa

Mixed martial arts 
 Kultar Gill, Indian-Canadian mixed martial artist
 Singh Jaideep, Indian-Japanese mixed martial artist
Arjun Bhullar, Indian-Canadian mixed martial artist

Artists

Allah Bakhsh, painter
Amrita Sher-Gil, painter
Anish Kapoor, sculptor
Abdur Rahman Chughtai, painter
Ahmed Parvez, painter
Bashir Mirza, painter
Zubeida Agha, painter
Rashid Rana, sculptor
Quddus Mirza, art critic

Architects
Ustad Ahmad Lahori, chief architect of Taj Mahal

See also 
 List of Punjabi Muslims
 Punjabis
 List of British Punjabis

References

Punjabi
Punjab